KCSJ (590 AM) is a commercial radio station licensed to Pueblo, Colorado, and serving Southern Colorado. The station is owned by iHeartMedia and licensed as iHM Licenses, LLC.  It airs a news/talk radio format. The studios and offices are on West 24th Street in Pueblo and the transmitter is off Quartz Street in Pueblo West, Colorado. KCSJ broadcasts at 1000 watts around the clock, using a directional antenna.

KCSJ carries mostly nationally syndicated programs from co-owned Premiere Networks. They include Glenn Beck, Sean Hannity, and Coast to Coast AM with George Noory. This Morning, America's First News with Gordon Deal from Compass Media Networks airs early on weekday mornings. Most hours begin with Fox News Radio.

History
The station first signed on in August 1947 as KCSJ and has kept the same call sign over its long history. It was owned by the local daily newspaper, the Chieftain-Star Journal (now The Pueblo Chieftain). The station still carries the call letters which refer to the newspaper.  Later it was bought by American Media and today is owned by iHeartMedia. Through the 1960s and 1970s, it played middle of the road music as well as news, farming and information shows. In the 1980s and 1990s, it moved to adult contemporary music coupled with talk shows and news, transitioning to all talk and news by 2000.

References

External links

FCC History Cards for KCSJ

CSJ
Radio stations established in 1947
1947 establishments in Colorado
IHeartMedia radio stations
News and talk radio stations in the United States